Raphah - tall - is a name in the Bible.

It is used at least four times:
 2 Samuel 21:16 - "and Ishbi-benob tried to kill David.-He was a descendant of the Raphah(f);" (The Jewish Publication Society Hebrew/English Tanakh, 1999 No. 5759).  Footnote f ("Apparently a race of giants")
 1 Chr. 8:2, 37 - A Benjamite, the son of Benjamin, a descendant of Saul.
 1 Chr. 20:4, 6 - In a margin-note, where "giant" is given in the text.
 Psalm 42:6 - a Hebrew word meaning to sink, relax, sink down, let drop, be disheartened (Strong Corcondance Entry No.7503)

Books of Samuel people
Books of Chronicles people
Set index articles on Hebrew Bible people